Alain Lefèvre,  (born July 23, 1962) is a French Canadian pianist and composer.  He is one of the Québécois pianists who have sold the greatest number of musical recordings.

In 2009, he was made a Knight of the National Order of Quebec. He was appointed an Officer of the Order of Canada in 2011.

Hailed as a "hero" (Los Angeles Times), a "smashing" performer (Washington Post), "a pianist who breaks the mold" (International Piano) and "who stands out from the typical trends and artifices offered on the international scene" (Classica), Lefèvre has performed in over forty countries to the most prestigious venues (Carnegie Hall, Kennedy Center, Royal Albert Hall, Royal Festival Hall, Théatre des Champs-Élysées, Théatre du Châtelet, Salle Pleyel, Teatro Colón, Palacio de Bellas Artes, Herodes Atticus Theatre, Epidaurus Theatre…) and participated to numerous international festivals (Ravinia, Saratoga, Wolf Trap, Athènes, Istanbul, Cervantino…). 

His performances were many times described as "unequaled" (Westdeutsche Zeitung) and "unparalleled" (Los Angeles Times, Sacramento Bee). Saluted for his "phenomenal technique" 

(The Spectator), his « sparkling playing resulting in fascinating interpretations » (Kölner Stadt Anzeiger), his "sovereign mastery" (Hamburger Abendblatt), Lefèvre has been guest soloist of great orchestras such as the Royal Philharmonic Orchestra, the Orchestre National de France, the Philadelphia Orchestra, Detroit Symphony, National Symphony, the China Philharmonic, the SWR, the Orchestre Philharmonique de Monte-Carlo, the Moscow Virtuosi, (…) and has collaborated with renowned conductors such as James Conlon, Charles Dutoit, Christoph Eschenbach, JoAnn Falletta, Claus Peter Flor, Lawrence Foster, Jacek Kaspszyk, Jacques Lacombe, Kent Nagano, Yannick Nézet-Séguin, Jukka-Pekka Saraste, Vladimir Spivakov and Yu Long.

Since the beginning of his career, Lefèvre has included, commissioned and battled for the music of our time. Alexander Brott, Walter Boudreau, John Corigliano, François Dompierre, Pierre-Max Dubois, Henri Dutilleux, Alain Payette are but a few of the composers he has added to his core répertoire.  Alain Lefèvre has also championed the music of the forgotten genius, composer and pianist André Mathieu, called the "Canadian Mozart". He was music director, composer, and pianist for the 2010 motion picture L'Enfant prodige, a film based on André Mathieu's life, produced by Denise Robert (Cinémaginaire).

His discography covers a vast repertoire, from John Corigliano's Piano Concerto, considered to be the reference version by BBC Music Magazine, to Chopin's 24 Preludes, where the critic "celebrates Alain Lefèvre", placing him along with the recordings of the "illustrious" Alicia de Larrocha, Ivan Moravec and Arthur Rubinstein (Fanfare).

Lefèvre has won numerous prizes, amongst them a JUNO, an Opus, ten Felix (ADISQ) and the AIB Award (London), for "International personality of the year – Radio", saluting his radio program broadcast on ICI Musique/Radio-Canada. He is Officer to the Order of Canada, Chevalier of the National Order of Quebec, Chevalier of the Pléiade Order and recipient of the Queen Elizabeth II Diamond Jubilee Medal.

Discography
Corigliano
Concerto for piano (KOCH International Classics), 1994, KIC-3-7250-2 H1  
Alain Lefèvre, Carl St-Clair, Pacific Symphony Orchestra

Fandango
Alain Lefèvre (KOCH International Classics), 1996, KIC-CD-7389  
Rameau, Scarlatti, Soler (piano)

Ballades
Alain Lefèvre (KOCH International Classics), 1996, KIC-3-7411-2 
Brahms, Chopin (piano)

Le Secret
Alain Lefèvre, Gino Quilico (KOCH International Classics), 1997, KIC-CD-7412 
Duparc, Fauré, Hahn, Payette (baryton, piano)

Confidences Poétiques
Alain Lefèvre (KOCH International Classics), 1998, KIC-3-7434-2H1  Alain Payette

Cadenza
Alain Lefèvre (CBC Records), 1999, MVCD 1129 
Bach, Beethoven, Brahms, Chopin, Debussy, Ravel, Satie, Schubert (piano)

Lylatov
Alain Lefèvre (Audiogram), 1999, ADCD 10131
Champagne, Ginastera, Lefèvre, Mathieu, Rodgers & Hart, Sancan, Satie (piano)

Carnet de notes
Alain Lefèvre (piano), (Audiogram), original works by Alain Lefèvre, 2002, ADCD 10156

Mozart
Concerto for piano, No. 23, k. 488, 1999, Réédition, 2002, CBC Records SMCD 5220  
Alain Lefèvre, Jean-François Rivest, Orchestre Symphonique de Laval

Rachmaninov & Moussorgsky
Alain Lefèvre (Analekta), 2001, FL 2 3122
Moments musicaux, Tableaux d'une Exposition (piano)

Liszt : Transcriptions oeuvres de Bach et Wagner
Alain Lefèvre, (Analekta), 2002, FL 2 3179

Concertos: Gershwin, Addinsell, Mathieu
Alain Lefèvre, Yoav Talmi, Orchestre Symphonique de Québec, (Analekta), 2003, AN 2 9814

Hommage à Mathieu 
André Mathieu (composer), Alain Lefèvre, (Analekta), 2005, AN 2 9275

Fidèles Insomnies – Blissfully Sleepless
Alain Lefèvre (piano), original works by Alain Lefèvre, 2006, AN 2 9276

Rhapsodies : Mathieu, Rachmaninov, Gershwin
Alain Lefèvre, Matthias Bamert, Orchestre Symphonique de Montréal, (Analekta), 2006, AN 2 9277

Selected Works: Mathieu, Liszt, Moussorgski, Rachmaninov, Addinsell, Boudreau
Alain Lefèvre, (Analekta), 2007, AN 2 928

Montreal Variations – Montreal Jazz Club Session 3
Alain Lefèvre (and others), (Analekta), 2007, AN 2 8833

Effusions 
Alain Lefèvre piano, Diane Dufresne voice
(Disques Présence), 2007, PRESCD – 7116

Schubert, Rachmaninov, Dreï Klavierstück, Nine Études-Tableaux
Alain Lefèvre (Analekta), 2008, AN 2 9279

Concerto No. 4, Mathieu
Alain Lefèvre, George Hanson, Tucson Symphony Orchestra, (Analekta), 2008, AN 2 9281

Franck, Lekeu – Sonatas /  Mathieu – Ballade Fantaisie
Alain Lefèvre piano, David Lefèvre violin, (Analekta), 2009, AN 2 9282

Concertino & Concertos – Mathieu, Shostakovich, Mendelssohn
Alain Lefèvre, David Lefèvre (violin), Paul Archibald (trumpeter), London Mozart Players
(Analekta), 2009, AN 2 9283

Jardin d'Images
Alain Lefèvre (piano), original works by (Analekta), 2009, AN 2 9279

L'Enfant prodige – The Child Prodigy
André Mathieu (composer), Alain Lefèvre (piano)
(Analekta), 2010, AN 2 9284-5

Mon Coffret Radio-Canada – Boxset of 4 CD
New release of Fandango, Ballades, Confidences Poétiques, Cadenza (1996-1999)
Alain Lefèvre (piano), (Radio-Canada) 2010, SRCCD4 -2366

Chausson – Concert
Alain Lefèvre (piano), David Lefèvre (violin), Quatuor Alcan
(Analekta), 2011, AN 29286

Petit Noël  (Christmas songs)
Alain Lefèvre (piano), Quatuor Philippe Dunnigan
(Analekta), 2011, AN 29289

François Dompierre, 24 Preludes
Alain Lefèvre, (piano)
(Analekta), 2012, AN 2 9292- 3

Rachmaninov & Scriabine
Alain Lefèvre, Kent Nagano, Montreal Symphony Orchestra
(Analekta), 2012, AN 2 9288

Chopin, 24 Preludes
Alain Lefèvre, (piano)
(Analekta), 2014, AN 2 9287

Rive Gauche 
Alain Lefèvre (piano), original works
(Analekta), Release date 17 March 2015

Rachmaninov & Haydn & Ravel
Alain Lefèvre, (piano)
(Analekta), 2015, AN 2 9296

Sas Agapo
Alain Lefèvre (piano), original works
(Analekta), Release date, October 2016, AN 2 9297

References

External links
 Official website
  Alain Lefèvre biography on audiogram.com

1962 births
Living people
People from Poitiers
Officers of the Order of Canada
Knights of the National Order of Quebec
Canadian composers
Canadian male composers
Canadian classical pianists
Male classical pianists
Musicians from Quebec
CBC Radio hosts
Juno Award for Classical Album of the Year – Large Ensemble or Soloist(s) with Large Ensemble Accompaniment winners
Canadian male pianists
21st-century classical pianists
21st-century Canadian male musicians